Jawanza Starling (born June 21, 1991) is an American football safety who is currently a free agent. He played college football for USC. He was signed by the Texans as an undrafted free agent in 2013. He has also been a member of the New York Giants.

Professional career

Houston Texans
Starling was signed by the Houston Texans after going unselected in the 2013 NFL Draft. He was released for final roster cuts before the start of the season.

New York Giants
The New York Giants signed Starling to their practice squad on September 3, 2013.

Second Stint with Texans
On November 14, 2013, the Texans signed Starling off the Giants' practice squad.
 
He was released on August 30, 2014.

References

External links
Houston Texans bio
NFL Combine Profile
USC Trojans football bio
USC Trojans baseball bio

1991 births
Living people
Players of American football from Tallahassee, Florida
American football safeties
USC Trojans football players
USC Trojans baseball players
Houston Texans players
New York Giants players